The Coastal Carolina Chanticleers softball team represents Coastal Carolina University in NCAA Division I college softball.  The team participates in the Sun Belt Conference. The Chanticleers are currently led by thirteenth-year head coach Kelley Green. The team plays its home games at St. John Stadium – Charles Wade-John Lott Field located on the university's campus.

References

 
Sun Belt Conference softball